The 2015–16 Kategoria Superiore was the 77th season of the top Albanian professional league for association football clubs, since its establishment in 1930. It was organised by the Albanian Football Association and it was the 13th season under the name Kategoria Superiore, which took over from the Albanian National Championship in 2003. The season began on 21 August 2015 and concluded on 18 May 2016.

Skënderbeu began the season as defending champions of the 2014–15 season. Bylis and Tërbuni entered as the two promoted teams from the  2014–15 Albanian First Division, but they were both relegated at the end of the season. 

Hamdi Salihi of Skënderbeu won the scoring title with 27 goals in 30 games. Alban Hoxha of Partizani led the league with 19 clean sheets in 32 games. Gugash Magani of Flamurtari and then Teuta won the Manager of the Season award.

Bylis, the 2014–15  Kategoria e Parë champion, returns to the top level after just one year of absence.

Stadiums

Personnel and kits 

Note: Flags indicate national team as has been defined under FIFA eligibility rules. Players and Managers may hold more than one non-FIFA nationality.

Managerial changes

League table

Results
Each team plays every opponent four times, twice at home and twice away, for a total of 36 games.

First half of season

Second half of season

Season statistics

Scoring

Top scorers

Hat-tricks

Clean sheets

Discipline

Player

Most yellow cards: 12
Orgest Gava (Bylis)
Kristi Vangjeli (Skënderbeu)

Most red cards: 3
Bruno Telushi (Flamurtari)

Club

Most yellow cards: 97
Bylis

Most red cards: 6
Flamurtari

Attendances

Notes

References

External links
 
Superliga at uefa.com
Livescore

2015-16
2015–16 in European association football leagues
1